Simon Kostner (born 30 November 1990) is an Italian ice hockey forward playing for Ritten Sport of the Alps Hockey League.

International play
Kostner has represented the Italian national team in several tournaments. His first International Ice Hockey Federation (IIHF)-sanctioned event was the 2007 World U18 Championships Division I. Italy placed fourth in the Group A tournament while Kostner recorded one assist in five games. He returned the following year to the 2008 Division I tournament; playing in Group A Italy finished fourth again and Kostner, serving as captain, had 7 points in 5 games.

He would play in three World Junior Championships: the 2008 Division II, the 2009 Division I, and the 2010 Division I tournaments.

Personal life
Kostner was born in Bolzano, and grew up in Northern Italy. He comes from a family of winter athletes: his father, Erwin Kostner, played ice hockey at the 1984 Winter Olympics for Italy, while his sister, Carolina Kostner, is a figure skater who won a bronze medal at the 2014 Winter Olympics.

References

External links

1990 births
Living people
Italian ice hockey forwards
JYP Jyväskylä players
Ritten Sport players
Ice hockey people from Bolzano
Ladin people
Competitors at the 2013 Winter Universiade